Lord Nicholas Wayman-Harris is a British film editor based in Santa Monica, California.

Wayman-Harris has worked on music videos with some of the biggest artists in the music world, including Radiohead, U2, Puff Daddy, The Spice Girls, Björk, Blur, Depeche Mode, George Michael, The Verve, Oasis, Kylie Minogue, Thirty Seconds to Mars and OK Go.  His vast body of commercial work includes major campaigns for Ford Motor Company, Bacardi, Toyota, Nike, AT&T, Audi and Compaq to name but a few.

Following on success from several short films including A Little Worm, Nicholas made his first foray into features on Event Horizon when he was asked by director Paul Anderson to cut the Visions of Hell sequence in the film.  His first full feature was The King is Alive directed by Kristian Levring .  Levring was part of the Danish collective who created the influential Dogme movement. The King is Alive was Dogme IV, and featured Jennifer Jason Leigh who won best actress for her role in the film at the Tokyo Film Festival. Nicholas was nominated for the "Best Editing" award at 2002 The Robert Festival (The Danish "Oscars"). The King is Alive was picked as an official selection at the 2002 Cannes Film Festival.  A second collaboration with Levring, The Intended, featuring Oscar winners Olympia Dukakis and Brenda Fricker and Oscar nominee Janet McTeer, premiered at the 2003 Toronto International Film Festival.

The film, Sinner directed by Marc Benardout, was awarded Best Feature Narrative at the 41st Brooklyn Arts Council International Film & Video Festival and Grand Jury Best Feature at the Buffalo Niagara Film Festival.

Nicholas has worked with the Strause Brothers on the 2010 sci-fi film "Skyline", a fast-paced and visually stunning alien invasion film. He has just finished "Snake and Mongoose" a film about the birth of drag racing due for release this year.

Awards
 Nominated, Best Editing,  Robert Festen (Denmark)

Filmography

Film 

 Aftermath (2017)
 Blood Is Blood (2016)
 Nightingale (2014)
 Snake and Mongoose (2013)
 Skyline (2010)
 Sinner (2007) 
 The Rope (2005)
 16mm Mystery (2004)
 The Intended (2002)
 The King Is Alive (2000)
 A Little Worm (1995)

Music Video 

 "Sound & Color" by Alabama Shakes (2015)
 "Kings and Queens" by Thirty Seconds to Mars (2009)
 "Song to Say Goodbye" by Placebo (2006)
 "Nothing Left to Lose" by Mat Kearney (2006)
 "At the Bottom of Everything" by Bright Eyes (2005)
 "Stars and Boulevards" by Augustana (2005)
 "Swing Life Away" by Rise Against (2005)
 "Happy?" by Mudvayne (2005)
 "Stronger" by Trust Company (2005)
 "Break Down the Doors" by Erick Morillo (2004)
 "Cry" by Alex Parks (2004)
 "Hysteria" by Muse (2004)
 "The Bitter End" by Placebo (2003)
 "Dinosaur Adventure 3D" by Underworld (2003)
 "Pagan Poetry" by Björk (2001)
 "Another Chance" by Roger Sanchez (2001)
 "Grounded" by My Vitriol (2001)
 "Dirge" by Death in Vegas (2000)
 "Joy!" by Gay Dad (1999)
 "Come with Me" by Puff Daddy featuring Jimmy Page (1998)
 "Furious Angels" by Rob Dougan (1998)
 "Please" by U2 (1997)
 "Bitter Sweet Symphony" by The Verve (1997)
 "Bruise Pristine" by Placebo (1997)
 "Where the Wild Roses Grow" by Nick Cave and Kylie Minogue (1995)
 "White Lines (Don't Do It)" by Duran Duran (1995)
 "Live Forever" by Oasis (1995)

External links
 
 Union Editorial (showreel)
 Digital Media net article
 DMN Forums

Living people
British film editors
Place of birth missing (living people)
Year of birth missing (living people)